The Bona Crusade or the Annaba crusade was a military campaign initiated by the King of Aragon Martin the Humane against the Hafsid sultanate, carried out in the summer of 1399.

Background 
Main articles:  and Crusade of Tedelis

The fleet gathered in Ibiza, amassing a total force of 70 ships and 7,500 crusaders. The fleet set sail in August 1398,and successfully reached Tedelis, which was sacked, killing around 1,000 villagers. After attacking the North African Coast, the expedition then headed towards Avignon to try to relive Pope Benedict XIII from the siege the city was under, led by Geoffrey Boucicaut who was opposed to the Avignon Pope. However, the fleet could not cross the Rhône due to the low water level of the river and directly grant aid, though they did manage to grant a three-month truce for the besieged. The following year, Martin ordered a repeat of the campaign, this time, directed at bona.

The Crusade 
after gathering a fleet of 6 galleys and 54 ships, and the Valencian, of 7 galleys and 23 ships in Mahón, Martin the Humane set sail on August 21 and on September 1, the war began and the next day the disembarkation of most of the military personnel began. The Muslims, warned by Majorcan merchants, had defended the city and gathered a large number of fighters. After taking a small fortress near the city, the attack was abandoned.

After the siege, the Valencian and Majorcan navy separated and ended up returning to the ports of origin without having achieved any victory.

Consequences 
The failure of the campaign forced Martin the Humane to  sign a peace treaty with Abu-Faris Abd-al-Aziz on 15 May 1403, which soon became ineffective.

References

14th century in Aragon
14th century in Ifriqiya
Crusades
1399